Colchester North may refer to: 

Colchester North (provincial electoral district), a current provincial electoral constituency in the Canadian province of Nova Scotia,
Colchester North (UK Parliament constituency), a former federal electoral constituency in the United Kingdom.